The action of 17 March 1917 was a German raid on British shipping in the Strait of Dover as well as the harbours of Ramsgate and Margate. Two flotillas of German torpedo boats set out from the coast of Flanders and split. One group attacked the British drifters and destroyers patrolling near Goodwin Sands, while the other attacked the towns of Ramsgate and Margate, shelling the towns and shipping in their harbors. Paragon was sunk and Llewellyn damaged before the Germans withdrew with no casualties.

References

Naval battles of World War I involving the United Kingdom
Naval battles of World War I involving Germany
Conflicts in 1917
March 1917 events
Strait of Dover
Margate
Ramsgate